Coaxial, co-axial, co-ax or coax describes a physical arrangement wherein two or more structures share a common axis.

Coaxial may also refer to:

Electronics
 Coaxial cable or simply "coax," a shielded electrical cable widely used for transmission of radio-frequency signals and in computer networking cables
 Coaxial antenna, a half-wave dipole antenna configuration
 Coaxial loudspeaker, a 2-way loudspeaker with the high and low drivers sharing the same axis

Connectors
 Coaxial connector, any one of various common types of RF connector
 Coaxial power connector, low-current connectors commonly used on consumer electronics

Other uses
 Coaxial escapement, a clock mechanism
 Coaxial mount, a weapon mount placing two or more weapons in parallel
 Coaxial rotors, a contra-rotating twin-rotor configuration for helicopters

See also
 Coaxil, a drug used to treat depression